Andreas Schliebener (born August 16, 1962) is a Canadian former professional ice hockey defenceman who spent parts of three seasons in the National Hockey League with the Vancouver Canucks during the 1980s.

Playing career
As a youth, Schliebener played in the 1975 Quebec International Pee-Wee Hockey Tournament with a minor ice hockey team from Gloucester, Ontario.

Schliebener was selected by the Canucks 49th overall in the 1980 NHL Entry Draft from the Peterborough Petes of the Ontario Hockey League. He would make his debut for the Canucks in the 1981–82 season, pressed into service at the age of just 19 due to a rash of injuries on the Canuck blueline. He would play 22 games for the Canucks that season and appear in 3 more games in the playoffs during Vancouver's surprising run to the Stanley Cup Finals, with his solid play earmarking him as a promising player for the future.

However, Schliebener would find himself in the American Hockey League for the entire 1982–83 season. In 1983–84 he found himself back on the Canucks, playing regularly for most of the season. He finished the year with 2 goals and 10 assists for 12 points in 52 games. The following year, though, he was back in the minors and played just 11 games for the Canucks. After another year in the AHL, he retired in 1986 at the age of 24.

Schliebener finished his career with 2 goals and 11 assists for 13 points in 83 NHL games, along with 74 penalty minutes.

Career statistics

References

External links

Profile at hockeydraftcentral.com

1962 births
Living people
Canadian ice hockey defencemen
Ice hockey people from Ottawa
Peterborough Petes (ice hockey) players
Niagara Falls Flyers players
Vancouver Canucks draft picks
Vancouver Canucks players
Fredericton Express players
Dallas Black Hawks players